Football Club Rio-Grandense, commonly known as Rio-Grandense, is a Brazilian football club based in Rio Grande, Rio Grande do Sul and part of state league competition in the state of Rio Grande do Sul. They won the Campeonato Gaúcho in 1939.

History
The club was founded on July 11, 1909. They won the Campeonato Gaúcho in 1939. and the Campeonato do Interior Gaúcho in 1939 and 1946. The club last participated in the Campeonato Gaúcho in 1985, and has taken a hiatus in league competitions since 2004.

Achievements
 Campeonato Gaúcho:
 Winners (1): 1939
 Runners-up (3): 1937, 1938, 1946
 Campeonato do Interior Gaúcho:
 Winners (2): 1939, 1946
 Rio Grande City Championship
 Winners (20): 1921, 1937, 1938, 1939, 1940, 1946, 1947, 1948, 1950, 1953, 1955, 1956, 1957, 1960, 1963, 1974, 1975, 1976, 1977, 1978.

Stadium
Rio-Grandense play their home games at Estádio Torquato Pontes, also known as Colosso do Trevo. The stadium has a maximum capacity of 15,000 people.

References

Association football clubs established in 1909
Football clubs in Rio Grande do Sul
1909 establishments in Brazil